Candalides cyprotus, the cyprotus blue or copper pencil-blue, is a species of butterfly of the family Lycaenidae. It is found along the east coast of Australia, including South Australia, New South Wales, Western Australia and Victoria.

The wingspan is about 30 mm. Adults females are dark brown with a large blue patch near the centre of each forewing. Males are purple with a black trident mark near the centre of each forewing. The underside of both sexes is pale fawn with arcs of brown carets and dots under both the forewings and hindwings.

The larvae have been recorded feeding on Conospermum taxifolium, Grevillea huegelii, Grevillea bracteosa, Grevillea juniperina, Hakea leucoptera and Jacksonia scoparia. They are green with pink and blue tubercles. Pupation takes place in a black pupa with a length of about 13 mm. It is made in the debris at the foot of the host plant.

Subspecies
Candalides cyprotus cyprotus - cyprotus blue (New South Wales to Western Australia)
Candalides cyprotus pallescens (Tite, 1963) (southern Queensland)

References

Candalidini
Butterflies described in 1886
Butterflies of Australia